The Hamish Canham Prize is awarded annually by the Poetry Society to the best poem featured in the Members' Poems competition of Poetry News. Poetry News is a quarterly newsletter with features, interviews and poetry circulated to members of the Poetry Society.

Each Members' Poems competition is judged by a professional poet. Judges have included Luke Kennard, Carrie Etter and David Wheatley.

The prize was established in 2004 by Sheena and Hugh Canham, in memory of their son, Hamish Canham (1962 – 2003).

Awards
2020 Jo Burns
2019 Carole Bromley
2018 Duncan Chambers
2017 Ramona Herdman
2016 Ian Humphreys
2015 Tess Jolly
2014 Suzanna Fitzpatrick
2013 Robin Houghton
2012 Joan Michelson
2011 Emma Danes
2010 Martin Figura
2009 Sheila Hillier
2008 Gill Learner
2007 Dorothy Pope
2006 Matt Barnard
2005 Judy Brown
2004 Denise Bennett

References

British poetry awards